Erigeron alpinus, the alpine fleabane, is a European species of perennial plant in the family Asteraceae. It is widespread across much of Europe except the far north.

The plants flowers are narrow and have a thread-like ray florets, which are made out of 2 or more rows.

Subspecies
 Erigeron alpinus subsp. alpinus 
 Erigeron alpinus subsp. intermedius (Rchb.) Pawł.
 Erigeron alpinus subsp. rhodopaeus (Vierh.) Kožuharov & N.Andreev

References

alpinus
Flora of Europe
Plants described in 1753
Taxa named by Carl Linnaeus